Meryem Bekmez (born 31 July 2000) is a Turkish race walker specialising in the 5000 metres and 10,000 metres. She is a native of Diyarbakır, Turkey. She was a member of the municipality-owned club of Kayapınar, before she was transferred by Enka SK in Istanbul.

Early life
Meryem Bekmez was born in Şilbe neighborhood of Yenişehir district of Diyarbakır, southeastern Turkey on 31 July 2000. In 2013, she was discovered for athletics by Çetin Aslan, a coach of the Turkish Athletic Federation when he visited her school. She was a seventh-grade student in the middle school.

Her father Hacı Bekmez told in an interview that "she would have been married off like her sister, or would be working on the field, had she not been discovered". Born and raised in a region where the practice of child marriage for girls is common, she escaped the traditional social pressure thanks to athletics, as she has emphasized.

Sports career
Bekmez placed first in the 3 km event at an intra-school running competition at provincial level. The same year, she ranked first  in a nationwide competition. Following her success in provincial and then in regional events, she was allowed to participate at the Turkish championships.

After she came runner-up in the 2014 Turkish Championships, she was admitted to the national team's preparation camp. In 2015, she became Turkish champion. Her international debut came at the Balkan Athletics Championships in 2016, where she became champion.

In 2016, Bekmez became champion in the 5,000m race walk event at the 2016 European Athletics Youth Championships in Tbilisi, Georgia, and broke the 12-year national record.

She competed in the 5,000m race walk at the 2017 World U18 Championships winning a silver medal. She also competed in the 10,000m race walk at the 2017 European U20 Championships winning a bronze medal.

Bekmez and her teammate Ayşe Tekdal of the Turkey national race walking team won the bronze medal at the 2018 IAAF World Race Walking Team Championships in Taicang, China. At the 2018 IAAF World U20 Championships in Tampere, Finland, she took the silver medal, and broke national records in junior and senior women's category with a time of 44:17.69. She set a national record and became World U20 leader in the 20 km walk event of the 2018 European Athletics Championships in Berlin, Germany although she placed only 11th.

During the first leg of the Turkish Race Walk League held in Konya in April 2019, she set a national record in the 5,000m  event of women's U20 category with her time of 21:54. She won the gold medal in juniors (U20) category of the 2019 European Race Walking Cup#Women's 10 km (U20) in Alytus, Lithuania. At the 2019 European Athletics U20 Championships held in Borås, Sweden, she captured the gold medal in the 10,000m race walk event.

Competition record

NR: National record
WU20L: World U20 leading

References

External links

Living people
2000 births
Sportspeople from Diyarbakır
Turkish female racewalkers
Enkaspor athletes
Athletes (track and field) at the 2020 Summer Olympics
Olympic athletes of Turkey
Olympic female racewalkers